Treasures from the Trash Heap is a tour-only album by indie rock band Elf Power.  The album, only available from the band at their performances on the initial Back to the Web tour, is a collection of unreleased demos and live songs, as well as cover versions of songs by bands such as R.E.M., The Olivia Tremor Control, and the Byrds.

Track listing
 "Temporary Arm" (country version)
 "Face in the Sand" (demo)
 "Feel a Whole Lot Better" (Byrds cover)
 "Dandy in the Underworld" (T.Rex cover)
 "Another Face" (demo)
 "Hole in My Shoe" (demo)
 "All the Same"
 "Rise High Giant Fly"
 "Historical Ant Wars"
 "Empty Pictures" (demo)
 "Princess Knows" (Olivia Tremor Control cover)
 "Invisible Men" (demo)
 "Dark Circles"
 "Underneath the Bunker" (R.E.M. cover)
 "Arrow Flies Close" (live at Horseshoe Tavern, Toronto)
 "Blackbirds"
 "Invisible Men" (techno version)
 "Run Through the Forest"
 "I Know I"
 "Spiders"
 "It's Not Cold"
 "Reuters" (Wire cover, live at Horseshoe Tavern, Toronto)
 "Honey" (Spacemen 3 cover, live at the Landfill, Athens, GA)
 "The Slider" (T.Rex cover)

2006 albums
Elf Power albums